Curtin Central bus station is a Transperth bus station located at the Curtin University's Bentley campus. It has twelve stands, six bus layover bays and is served by six Transperth routes operated by Path Transit and Swan Transit.

Overview
Curtin Central bus station was opened on 17 February 2019. It took 18 months to construct. Initially, 944 buses served the station each weekday. It was a joint project between the Public Transport Authority (PTA) and Curtin University. The total budget was $15 million, with the PTA contributing $5 million, and Curtin University paying for the rest. It is at the centre of the Curtin Exchange Precinct, a transit-oriented development featuring student accommodation and retail.

Bus routes

References

  

Bus stations in Perth, Western Australia
Transport infrastructure completed in 2019
2019 establishments in Australia